Nasarian is a nearly extinct Oceanic language of southwest Malekula, Vanuatu, though the handful of speakers includes children.

References

Malekula languages
Languages of Vanuatu
Critically endangered languages§